Let It Burn is a studio album by Canadian dubstep producer and artist Troy Beetles, better known as Datsik. It was released digitally on September 24, 2013 in the United States through his own label Firepower Records. It is the sequel release to the Cold Blooded EP, which was released on January 22, 2013.

A remix EP for the track "Hold It Down" (featuring Georgia Murray) was released on April 15, 2014.

Background and release 
Let It Burn is Datsik's second full-length studio album, the first being Vitamin D. The album features production from fellow Firepower Records artist Getter and Los Angeles-based electronic music producer Bais Haus, and includes collaborations with singer Georgia Murray in the track "Hold It Down" and rapper Zyme in the track "Oxygen". The track "Scum" is inspired by the video game character and franchise Duke Nukem.

Track listing 
 
 (co.) designates co-producer

Charts

References 

2013 albums
Datsik (musician) albums
Albums produced by Datsik (musician)